Patrick Matangi (born 13 January 1967) is a Zimbabwean judoka. He competed at the 1988 Summer Olympics and the 1992 Summer Olympics.

References

External links
 

1967 births
Living people
Zimbabwean male judoka
Olympic judoka of Zimbabwe
Judoka at the 1988 Summer Olympics
Judoka at the 1992 Summer Olympics
Place of birth missing (living people)
African Games medalists in judo
Competitors at the 1999 All-Africa Games
African Games silver medalists for Zimbabwe